Shades of Greene is a British television series based on short stories written by the author Graham Greene. The series began in 1975, with each hour-long episode featuring a dramatisation of one of Greene's stories, many of which dealt with issues such as guilt and the Catholic faith, as well as looking at life in general. Actors to have appeared in the series include John Gielgud, Leo McKern, Virginia McKenna, Paul Scofield, Lesley Dunlop, John Hurt and Roy Kinnear.

The series began on 9 September 1975 and ran for two seasons.

List of episodes

Season 1

Season 2

Overseas sales
The series was broadcast by the Nine Network in Australia.

Book
These 18 short stories were re-published in their original form, with cast list and names of dramatiser  and director, in the collection Shades of Greene jointly by The Bodley Head and William Heinemann, London, in 1975.

External links 
 

1970s British drama television series
1975 British television series debuts
1976 British television series endings
Adaptations of works by Graham Greene
ITV television dramas
Television shows produced by Thames Television
Television series by Fremantle (company)
English-language television shows